Springdale is a historic farm property at 1663 Apple Pie Ridge Road in rural northern Frederick County, Virginia.  The roughly  property includes a well-preserved brick Federal-style farmhouse built in 1820, and a number of later outbuildings.  It includes two stone outbuildings, a springhouse and smokehouse, that predate the house by about 13 years.  The property was owned and farmed by the Lupton family for more than 150 years.

The property was listed on the National Register of Historic Places in 2016.

See also
 National Register of Historic Places listings in Frederick County, Virginia

References

Houses on the National Register of Historic Places in Virginia
Houses completed in 1820
Houses in Frederick County, Virginia
National Register of Historic Places in Frederick County, Virginia